Dalit studies is a new field of research in India which looks at the problem of marginalised groups, namely Dalits, tribals, religious minorities, women from excluded groups, denotified tribes, physically challenged and similar groups in economic, social and political spheres. Dalit studies scholars also undertake research on the nature and forms of discrimination and social exclusion faced by marginalised groups.

The broad objectives of Dalit studies can be delineated as follows:

To  undertake research to develop an understanding of the consequences of social exclusion and discrimination on economic growth and poverty, education, health, political participation and on the well-being of the marginalised social groups.
To undertake research on policies to overcome discrimination, particularly 'exclusion and discrimination-induced deprivation' and its consequences.
To provide knowledge support to policy-making bodies to develop inclusive policies.	
To provide knowledge support to international development and funding agencies to enable them to shape their approach and funding policies towards problems of excluded groups.
To provide knowledge-support to civil society organisations at the grassroot, state and national levels.

Institutions
 Indian Institute of Dalit Studies (IIDS) situated in New Delhi, headed by Sukhadeo Thorat.

See also
Nicolas Jaoul
Eleanor Zelliot
Dalit literature

References

Further reading 

 Satyanarayana, K & Tharu, Susie (2011) No Alphabet in Sight: New Dalit Writing from South Asia, Dossier 1: Tamil and Malayalam, New Delhi: Penguin Books. (Excerpt)
 Satyanarayana, K & Tharu, Susie (2013) From those Stubs Steel Nibs are Sprouting: New Dalit Writing from South Asia, Dossier 2: Kannada and Telugu, New Delhi: HarperCollins India.
 Dalit – The Black Untouchables of India, by V.T. Rajshekhar. 2003 – 2nd print, Clarity Press, Inc. .
 Untouchable!: Voices of the Dalit Liberation Movement, by Barbara R. Joshi, Zed Books, 1986. , .
 Dalits and the Democratic Revolution – Dr. Ambedkar and the Dalit Movement in Colonial India, by Gail Omvedt. 1994, Sage Publications. .
 The Untouchables: Subordination, Poverty and the State in Modern India, by Oliver Mendelsohn, Marika Vicziany, Cambridge University Press, 1998, .
 Dalit Identity and Politics, by Ranabira Samaddara, Ghanshyam Shah, Sage Publications, 2001. , .
 Journeys to Freedom: Dalit Narratives, by Fernando Franco, Jyotsna Macwan, Suguna Ramanathan. Popular Prakashan, 2004. , .
 Towards an Aesthetic of Dalit Literature, by Sharankumar Limbale. 2004, Orient Longman. .
 From Untouchable to Dalit – Essays on the Ambedkar Movement, by Eleanor Zelliot. 2005, Manohar. .
 Dalit Politics and Literature, by Pradeep K. Sharma. Shipra Publications, 2006. , .
 Dalit Visions: The Anti-caste Movement and the Construction of an Indian Identity, by Gail Omvedt. Orient Longman, 2006. , .
 Muthukkaruppan, Parthasarathi.(2018) " Preliminary Remarks on Dalit Poetry" Rethinking Marxism Vol.30 no.1 available at https://www.tandfonline.com/doi/abs/10.1080/08935696.2018.1456762?journalCode=rrmx20
 Dalits in Modern India – Vision and Values, by S M Michael. 2007, Sage Publications. .
 Dalit Literature : A Critical Exploration, by Amar Nath Prasad & M.B. Gaijan. 2007. .
 Debrahmanising History : Dominance and Resistance in Indian Society, by Braj Ranjan Mani. 2005. . Manohar Publishers and Distributors.

External links
 http://www.dalitstudies.org.in/

 
Social history of India
Interdisciplinary subfields of sociology